El juicio de los padres, is a Mexican telenovela that aired on  Canal 4, Telesistema Mexicano in 1960.

Plot 
The story of a very sympathetic marquis who forces his daughter to marry a noble and renowned man, but she is in love with a poor man.

Cast 
 José Gálvez (:es:José Manuel Gálvez Velandia)
 Virginia Manzano
 Freddy Fernández "El Pichi"
 Silvia Suárez
 Luis Bayardo
 Dacia González
 Angel Garasa

References 

1960 telenovelas
Mexican telenovelas
Televisa telenovelas
Television shows set in Mexico City
1960 Mexican television series debuts
1960 Mexican television series endings
Spanish-language telenovelas